The Okinawa Arena, also provisionally known as the Okinawa City Multi-Purpose Arena, is an indoor arena  in Okinawa, Japan. It was opened in 2020 and will be one of the venues of the 2023 FIBA Basketball World Cup.

Background

Plans to build the Okinawa arena were made as early as 2015. In 2016, it was announced that the sports venue will be built over the site occupied by the Okinawa City bullfighting ring next to the Koza Sports Park. Sachiyo Kuwae, the city mayor, unveiled the master plan for the 10,000-person-capacity multipurpose arena on 12 July 2016. The facility will have five stories above ground and will have a parking area for 1,000 vehicles.

Its estimated total cost, including its parking facilities, is 17 billion yen.

Demolition of the bullfighting ring was planned to commence in 2017 and was followed by the construction of the arena building itself. The groundbreaking ceremony took place on September 25, 2018 and is planned to open by September 2020.

Use
The Okinawa Arena is planned to be the home venue of the Ryukyu Golden Kings professional basketball team and is also set to host major events in Okinawa City.

It will be Japan's sole venue in the 2023 FIBA Basketball World Cup which will also be co-hosted by the Philippines and Indonesia.

References

External links
  

Okinawa, Okinawa
Sports venues in Okinawa Prefecture
Basketball venues in Japan
Ryukyu Golden Kings
Sports venues completed in 2020
2020 establishments in Japan